H. Arnold Steinberg,  (May 12, 1933 – December 11, 2015) was a Canadian businessman, philanthropist and Chancellor of McGill University.

Life and career 
Born in Montreal, Quebec in 1933, the son of Nathan (who was the brother of Sam Steinberg) and Annie Steinberg, he received a Bachelor of Commerce degree from the McGill University Faculty of Management in 1954 and a Master of Business Administration degree in 1957 from Harvard Business School.

In 1957, he started working at Dominion Securities Corp. Ltd. before joining his family's Steinberg Inc. in 1958. He would remain at the company until 1989 and was Chief Financial Officer.

From 1996 to 2000, he was Chairman of the Board of the McGill University Health Centre. He was a member of the Governing Council of the Canadian Institutes of Health Research. He was appointed Chancellor of McGill University in May 2009, effective July 1, 2009, succeeding Dick Pound.

He was married to Dr. Blema Steinberg, a Professor Emeritus of McGill University. They had three children: Margot, Donna and Adam. Steinberg died in Montreal on December 11, 2015 at the age of 82.

Honours and awards 
In 1993, he was made a Member of the Order of Canada in recognition of having "supported many of Montréal's charitable and cultural institutions". In 2000, he was awarded an honorary doctorate from McGill University. He became an Officer of the Order of Quebec in 2013.

References

1933 births
2015 deaths
Anglophone Quebec people
Businesspeople from Montreal
Canadian people of Hungarian-Jewish descent
Chancellors of McGill University
Harvard Business School alumni
Jewish Canadian philanthropists
McGill University Faculty of Management alumni
Members of the Order of Canada
20th-century philanthropists